Sabogal is a surname. The origin of the surname Sabogal is Hungarian. Sabogal is the union of two popular Hungarian surnames, Szabó which means tailor, and Gál which means gal. This surname has migrated to Italy and from there to America.
Notable people with the surname include:

Fernando Sabogal Viana (1941−2013), Colombian Roman Catholic bishop
Isabel Sabogal (born 1958), Polish-Peruvian author
Jessica Sabogal (born 1987), Colombian-American Painter and Muralist
José Sabogal (1888–1956), Peruvian painter
Monsignor Moisés Sabogal Romero, Bishop of Catacaos, Piura, Peru helped the population in the earthquake at the beginning of the 20th century.
Dr. Ricardo Richard Sabogal-Suji Ph.D., American anthropologist, author of theories, ethnographies, studies, research, and books on human culture.
Sor Rosa Sabogal, nun benefactor in India, Italy, Ecuador and Peru.
Joselito Sabogal, Peruvian painter.
José Sabogal Wiesse, son of the painter Jose Sabogal Dieguez, he was an engineer dedicated to the study of Andean culture.

 Mauricio Sabogal (Colombian/American ) most powerful latino in the media agency business, according AdAge. www.mauriciosabogal.com